Kaldis is a surname. Notable people with the surname include: 

Aristodimos Kaldis (1899–1979), American artist
Georgios Kaldis (born 1906), Greek boxer
Georgios Emmanouil Kaldis (1875–1953), Greek lawyer, journalist, and politician
Jim Kaldis (1932–2007), Australian politician